Bruno N'Diaye (born 5 March 1969) is a Senegalese swimmer. He competed at the 1988 Summer Olympics and the 1992 Summer Olympics.

References

1969 births
Living people
Senegalese male swimmers
Olympic swimmers of Senegal
Swimmers at the 1988 Summer Olympics
Swimmers at the 1992 Summer Olympics
Place of birth missing (living people)